Infillion, formerly known as TrueX, Inc. (stylized as true[X]) and SocialVibe, is an American digital advertising company founded in 2007 by Joe Marchese, Brandon Mills and David Levy. The company is headquartered in Los Angeles and New York City. As of September 28, 2020, it is a wholly owned subsidiary of Gimbal, Inc.; previously owned by 21st Century Fox from 2014 until Disney's acquisition of 21st Century Fox in 2019 and The Walt Disney Company from 2019 until 2020.

Company history 

TrueX received $4.2 million in Series A funding led by Redpoint Ventures in December 2007, and originally enabled consumers to raise money for the social causes they wished to support. It was launched in February 2008 in public beta, and, as of October 19, 2009, its members have raised a total of more than $700,000 for their respective charities. On August 25, 2008, SocialVibe formed a partnership with Interpublic, one of its largest liaisons to date. In January 2009, Jafco Ventures led an initiative along with Redpoint Ventures to raise the total amount invested in the company to $12 million, as the company shifts to a revenue sharing model with the charities it represents (all of the money raised on TrueX formerly went to the charity itself) In March 2011, TrueX closed a $20 million round of funding led by Norwest Venture Partners. In 2013 the company became known as TrueX, and between 2013 and 2014, the company doubled its revenues. In May 2014 the company also received an additional $6 million in funding. Directors of the company include James Murdoch, Mich Matthews, and Jonathan Miller. The CEO of the company is co-founder Joe Marchese. Other co-founders include Brandon Mills and David Levy.

On March 17, 2020, The Walt Disney Company announced that they were looking to sell TrueX as the company had considered it a non-core asset and neither operated as part of Disney's sales nor tech divisions. Disney announced the sale to Gimbal, Inc. on September 28, 2020.

On March 1, 2022, Gimbal, Inc. announced that they had rebranded the company's name to Infillion.

Engagement advertising
TrueX has worked with Microsoft, Visa, Apple, Disney, Coca-Cola, Kia Motors, Kraft Foods, Macy's, Nestlé, Procter & Gamble and Discover Card on online advertisements. The company delivers ad units that are self-selected by the viewer in exchange for access to online content such as videos, music, games, or more articles. The ads take over the browser of a user's computer for about 30 seconds, and require user participation for completion. The results are measured in engagement metrics, such as submitted survey forms, video views, likes, and shares. TrueX is also a source of ad inventory for text and visual ads. The company has deals in place to provide ad space with publishers such as Tribune Company, Fox Sports, Pandora Radio, and AT&T, distributing them programatically. The engagement has reduced digital ad fraud.

Awards and recognition 
In August 2010, Forbes recognized SocialVibe's engagement for Microsoft Bing on Zynga's FarmVille as one of the "Best-Ever Social Media Campaigns". The campaign garnered over 425,000 fans for Bing in less than one day, and 70% of the fans visited the search engine in the following month. The campaign was also won an OMMA Award for Online Advertising Creativity in the social media category in September 2010.

References

External links 
 

2007 establishments in the United States
Companies based in Los Angeles
Companies based in New York City
Digital marketing companies of the United States
Former subsidiaries of The Walt Disney Company